Central Lake Ontario Conservation Authority (CLOCA), is a conservation authority established under the Conservation Authorities Act of Ontario in 1958. It forms a partnership with the Province of Ontario, the Ministry of Natural Resources, the regional municipality of Durham, and its constituent local municipalities.

Conservation areas

Bowmanville / Westside Marshes Conservation Area
Enniskillen Conservation Area
Heber Down Conservation Area
Long Sault Conservation Area
Lynde Shores Conservation Area
Purple Woods Conservation Area
Stephen's Gulch Conservation Area
Crow's Pass Conservation Area

External links 

Central Lake Ontario Conservation Authority

Conservation authorities in Ontario